Gurdeep Singh Chadha (22 October 1960 – 17 November 2012), also known as Ponty Chadha, was an Indian businessman who owned the Wave Group.

Early life
During the Partition, a person named Kulwant Singh Chadha migrated from what subsequently became Pakistan to set up a mini sugar mill in the Moradabad district of Uttar Pradesh. It was around that time that Ponty, the first offspring of the family, was born. As a young boy, Ponty Chadha used to help his father in the business. As a man, he went on to manage the entire Wave Group.

Business
Chadha was also involved into the business of liquor, multiplexes, malls and cinemas. In 2009 General Elections, due to a change in Uttar Pradesh government policy to control the trafficking of spurious liquor, the system of multiple wholesale dealers was abolished. This led to the monopoly of Chadha group who acquired the license to sell wholesale alcohol single-handedly in the whole state. Besides India, the distribution network covers Nepal, Bhutan, United States, UK and several other Arabian and Asian countries.

 However, .

Philanthropy

The school aims at total self-reliance and its curriculum is specifically tailored for that. Alongside academic learning, it trains children on art and handicraft for all-round development. Dedicated outlets at Wave Malls further promote the merchandise produced in-house by the children.

Death
Ponty Chadha, died on 17 November 2012 and his death remains mired in mystery.  The cause of the death is said to be crossfire between him and brother Hardeep, though varied accounts of the incident can be found. One of the arguments is that disputed ownership over a piece of property led to the crossfire; speculations in the media of the brothers being in loggerheads over the family business were also rife, but all these have remained largely unconfirmed in the public domain.

Moreover, sources debating the incident, including Taranjit Singh, who is claimed to be a close family relative, confirm that Ponty was handicapped in both hands and could not possibly have fired at his brother. It was also later established when during the investigations it came out that Hardeep had initiated the crossfire.

In January 2014, murder charges against all the 21 accused were dropped by a trial court in Delhi, including Sukhdev Singh Namdhari, ex-chairman of Uttarakhand's minority commission who was arrested on 23 November for shooting at Hardeep Chadha.

However, charges of culpable homicide not amounting to murder were invoked against Namdhari and his Personal Security Officer, Sachin Tyagi while the 19 other accused were charged with attempt to murder.

The Delhi Police, in July 2014, contested the ruling in the Delhi High Court which accepted the plea and served fresh notices to the 21 accused.

During its investigations, Delhi Police also discovered that armed PSOs (Personal Security Officers) commissioned with the Punjab Police were accompanying the Chadha brothers beyond their jurisdiction.

An intervention from the Home Ministry has been sought as to why Delhi Police was not intimated.

References

Businesspeople from Uttar Pradesh
Indian chief executives
1957 births
2012 deaths
Deaths by firearm in India
People from Moradabad
Crime in Uttar Pradesh
People murdered in Delhi
20th-century Indian businesspeople